Arginine-glutamic acid dipeptide repeats protein is a protein that in humans is encoded by the RERE gene.

Function 

This gene encodes a member of the atrophin family of arginine-glutamic acid (RE) dipeptide repeat-containing proteins. The encoded protein co-localizes with a transcription factor in the nucleus, and its overexpression triggers apoptosis. A similar protein in mouse associates with histone deacetylase and is thought to function as a transcriptional co-repressor during embryonic development. Recent reports also indicate that RERE and its Drosophila homolog associate with histone methyltransferases in regulating gene expression. Multiple transcript variants encoding different isoforms have been found for this gene.

Interactions 

RERE has been shown to interact with ATN1.

References

Further reading